The Connacht Senior League is a rugby union competition for senior clubs in the Irish province of Connacht. It was first played for in 1925-26.

It has traditionally been ranked second in importance to the Connacht Senior Cup. With the formation of the All-Ireland League it has declined in importance somewhat with the advent of Professional Rugby, and the participation of the regional team Connacht Rugby in competitions such as the United Rugby Championship and European Rugby Champions Cup.

Performance by Team

Past winners

1920s
 1925–26 Galwegians
 1926–27 Loughrea
 1927–28 Ballinasloe
 1928–29 Ballina

1930s
 1929–30 Ballina
 1930–31 UCG
 1931–32 UCG
 1932–33 UCG
 1933–34 Corinthians
 1934–35 UCG
 1935–36 Corinthians
 1936–37 UCG
 1937–38 UCG
 1938–39 Corinthians

1940s
 1940 Corinthians
 1941 Corinthians
 1942 UCG
 1943 Corinthians
 1944 Corinthians
 1945 Ballinasloe
 1946 Ballinasloe
 1947 Galwegians
 1948 UCG
 1949 Ballinasloe

1950s
 1950 Corinthians
 1951 Corinthians/Ballina
 1952 Corinthians
 1953 Ballina
 1954 Corinthians
 1955 UCG
 1956 Athlone
 1957 Galwegians
 1958 Galwegians
 1959 Galwegians

1960s
 1960 Galwegians
 1961 Galwegians
 1962 UCG beat Galwegians
 1963 UCG
 1964 Galwegians
 1965 Corinthians beat Athlone
 1966 UCG/Galwegians
 1967 UCG
 1968 UCG
 1969 UCG

1970s
 1970 Galwegians
 1971 Galwegians beat Ballinasloe
 1972 Galwegians
 1973 UCG
 1974 Corinthians beat Athlone
 1975 UCG
 1976 Corinthians beat Athlone
 1977 Athlone
 1978 Corinthians
 1979 Corinthians

1980s
 1980 Corinthians
 1981 Corinthians
 1982 Corinthians
 1983 Corinthians
 1984 Galwegians beat Athlone
 1985 Galwegians beat Athlone
 1986 Corinthians beat Athlone
 1987 Athlone
 1988 Corinthians
 1989 Athlone beat Corinthians

1990s
 1990 Galwegians beat Corinthians
 1991 Galwegians beat Sligo
 1992 Galwegians beat Ballina
 1993 Ballina beat Corinthians
 1994
 1995
 1996
 1997
 1998 Buccaneers
 1999 Buccaneers

2000s
 2000 Buccaneers
 2001 Galwegians
 2002 Galwegians beat Buccaneers
 2003 Galwegians
 2004 Buccaneers beat Galwegians
 2005 Galwegians
 2006 Buccaneers beat Galwegians
 2007 Buccaneers beat Galwegians
 2008 Buccaneers beat Connemara 33-3
 2009 Galwegians

2010s
 2009–10 Galwegians
 2010–11 Buccaneers
 2011–12 Galwegians
 2012–13 Galwegians
 2013–14 Galwegians
 2014–15 Galwegians
 2015–16 Buccaneers 
 2016–17 Buccaneers
 2017–18 Buccaneers beat Galwegians
 2018–19 Buccaneers

2020s
 2019–20 Sligo
 2020-21 - No competition
 2021–22 Ballina
 2022–23 Buccaneers

See also
 Leinster Senior League
 Munster Senior League
 Ulster Senior League
 Connacht Senior Cup

References

3
Rugby union competitions in Connacht
Irish senior rugby competitions